Etap or ETAP may refer to:

 École des troupes aéroportées, a training school for paratroops in Pau, France
 Entreprise Tunisienne d'Activités Pétrolières, a state-owned petroleum company in Tunisia
 Etap Hotel, now renamed Ibis Budget
Electrical Transient Analyzer Program 
 ETAP Lighting
 ETAP Yachting, a Belgian boatbuilder
 Eastern Trough Area Project
 Exercise-related transient abdominal pain, also known as a side stitch